This is a list of fellows of the Royal Society elected in 1717.

Fellows
 Henry Barham (c. 1670–1726)
 Roger Gale (1672–1744)
 Orlando Gee (fl. 1717–1723)
 John Hadley (1682–1744)
 Johann August Hugo (1686–1716)
 Walter Jeffreys (fl. 1717–1753)
 James Jurin (1684–1750)
 Edmond Littlehales (c. 1690–1724)
 Ludovico Antonio Muratori (1673–1750)
 Samuel Scheurer (1685–1749)
 Francesco Torti (1658–1741)
 Elihu Yale (1649–1721)

References

1717
1717 in science
1717 in England